Cyphogastra foveicollis is a Jewel Beetle of the Buprestidae family.

Description
The basic colour of the elytra and thorax may be metallic dark green or dark purplish.

Distribution
This species occurs in West Papua.

References

Buprestidae
foevicollis
Beetles described in 1835